The Spring Valley School District 120 Building is a historic school building on County Road 379 in the small village of Spring Valley, Washington County, Arkansas, behind the Spring Valley Baptist Church.  It is a single-story stone masonry structure with a hip roof and an entrance recessed under an arched corner porch.  It was built in 1934, at the height of the Great Depression, apparently through local efforts, and is reflective of that period of public education in the Ozark region.

The building was listed on the National Register of Historic Places in 1992.

See also
National Register of Historic Places listings in Washington County, Arkansas

References

School buildings on the National Register of Historic Places in Arkansas
National Register of Historic Places in Washington County, Arkansas
School buildings completed in 1934
Schools in Washington County, Arkansas
1934 establishments in Arkansas